Petalopoma is a genus of sea snails, marine gastropod mollusks in the family Siliquariidae.

Species
Species within the genus Petalopoma include:
 Petalopoma elisabettae Schiaparelli, 2002
 Petalopoma indoensis Dharma, 2011

References

External links

Siliquariidae